Coston is a surname. Notable people with the surname include:

Bernadette Coston (born 1989), South African field hockey player
Henry Coston (1910–2001), French journalist, writer and Nazi collaborator
Jeff Coston (born 1955), American golfer
Junius Coston (born 1983), American football player
Martha Coston (1826–1904), American inventor and businesswoman

See also
Costen